Anwar Sidali Shakunda (born 12 April 1999) is a Somali footballer who plays as a forward for Horseed and the Somalia national team.

Club career
In 2018, Shakunda signed for Elman, joining from Jeenyo United. Shakunda was the Somali First Division top scorer in both 2018 and 2019. In 2021, Shakunda signed for Dekedaha. Later that year, Shakunda signed for Horseed.

International career
On 5 September 2019, Shakunda made his debut for Somalia, scoring in a 1–0 win against Zimbabwe, marking Somalia's first ever FIFA World Cup qualification victory.

International goals
Scores and results list Somalia's goal tally first.

Notes

References

1999 births
Living people
Association football forwards
Somalian footballers
Somalia international footballers
Elman FC players